Thruston is an unincorporated community located in Daviess County in the U.S. state of Kentucky, northeast of Owensboro.

Demographics

References 

Unincorporated communities in Daviess County, Kentucky